PLAY: The Games Festival is an Italian gaming convention organized by gamers. The 2015 editions got 30,000 attendees. There is a focus on playing, with hundreds of tables and events devoted to gaming.

History
The Italian Gamers Con started in 1982. It moving year after year between Pavia, Padova, Modena, Verona, Roma and so on. After a few years few cities/associations were able to manage such a big event so The Gamers Con found a place in Modena in 2002 with the name of ModCon organized by the local game association Club TreEmme.

From 1999 to 2007 in Modena, ModCon focused on play tournaments with the gamers as main characters. It attracted names like Jervis Jonson, Gary Gygax, Poul Bonner, Andrea Seyfarth, William Attia and Cristophe Boelinger.

From 2008 ModCon moved from Polisportiva Sacca to ModenaFiere and became PLAY: The Games Festival. The first edition was able to attract more than 10,000 visitors with more than 500 tables dedicated to games, more than 40 clubs/associations were involved in the 2008 edition with more than 150 games events including several national championships finals.

The 2019 edition got more than 44.000 visitors with 4 halls dedicated to board games, role-playing.games, miniature games, LARP and more.

PLAY includes Board games, Role-playing games, collectible card games, 3D games, Live games, War-games, Puzzle-Games and Video games. There is a Modelling sector and the biggest Games Hall in Italy.

Some more recent games are yo-kai watch, Pokémon sun and Pokémon moon.

Editions

References

External links 

Gaming conventions